The First Lady of Lebanon is the title attributed to the wife of the President of Lebanon. The country's most recent first lady was Nadia Aoun, wife of former President General Michel Aoun

List of first ladies of the Lebanese Republic (1943–present)

References

Lebanon